The 1994 Pro Bowl was the NFL's all-star game for the 1993 season. The game was played on February 6, 1994, at Aloha Stadium in Honolulu, Hawaii. The final Score was NFC 17, AFC 3. Andre Rison of the Atlanta Falcons was the game's MVP. This was also Joe Montana's last Pro Bowl appearance (coincidentally, the coaches for this game were from both teams that Montana played for in his career: Kansas City's Marty Schottenheimer and San Francisco's George Seifert). The referee was Gordon McCarter.

The game was tied 3-3 at halftime on field goals by Norm Johnson of the Atlanta Falcons and Gary Anderson of the Pittsburgh Steelers. The NFC scored late in the 3rd quarter on a 4-yard touchdown run by Los Angeles Ram rookie, Jerome Bettis. The NFC scored again in the 4th quarter on a touchdown pass from Bobby Hebert (Falcons) to Cris Carter (Minnesota Vikings) to provide the final margin.

AFC roster

Offense

Defense

Special teams

NFC roster

Offense

Defense

Special teams

References

External links

Pro Bowl
Pro Bowl
Pro Bowl
Pro Bowl
Pro Bowl
American football competitions in Honolulu
February 1994 sports events in the United States
1990s in Honolulu
1994 in American sports